Koteshwara Brahmins (also known as Koteshwara Magane Brahmins) are a Hindu Brahmin subcaste mainly from the Indian state of Karnataka. The community is mainly concentrated in the Koteshwara, Kundapur, and surrounding areas of Udupi district in Karnataka. The community takes its name from the village Koteshwara, which is their native place. Koteshwara Brahmins follows the Dvaita Vedanta propounded by Madhvacharya and are followers of Sodhe Vadiraja Swami Matha.

See also 
 Kannada Brahmins

References

Kannada Brahmins
Mangalorean society
Brahmin communities of Karnataka